Homelix arcuata is a species of beetle in the family Cerambycidae. It was described by Chevrolat in 1855, originally under the genus Pachystola. It is known from Gabon, Cameroon, and Nigeria.

References

Phrynetini
Beetles described in 1855